Kyrkjedalshalsen Saddle is an ice saddle between Gessner Peak and Habermehl Peak in the Mühlig-Hofmann Mountains of Queen Maud Land, Antarctica. It was plotted from surveys and air photos by the Sixth Norwegian Antarctic Expedition, 1956–60, and named Kyrkjedalshalsen (the church valley's neck).

References

Mountain passes of Queen Maud Land
Princess Astrid Coast